Mount Shearer is a peak rising to 2,100 m, 2 miles (3.2 km) northwest of Mount Jamroga in the central portion of the Bowers Mountains. Named by the New Zealand Antarctic Place-Names Committee (NZ-APC) in 1983 after Ian J. Shearer, elected to the Parliament of New Zealand, 1975; Minister of Science and Technology, 1980–83.

Mountains of Victoria Land
Pennell Coast